Ruben of Dairinis (died 725) was an Irish scholar. He was, along with Cú Chuimne of Iona, responsible for the great compendium known as Collectio canonum Hibernensis (Irish collection of Canon law).

Sources
 "Hiberno-Latin Literature to 1169", Dáibhí Ó Crónín, "A New History of Ireland", volume one, 2005.
 Die irische Kanonensammlung, ed. Hermann Wasserschleben, Leipzig, 1885.
 Some seventh-century Hiberno-Latin texts and their relationships, Aidan Breen, Peritia, iii, pp. 204–14, 1984.

725 deaths
8th-century Irish writers
Irish scholars and academics
Irish Latinists
8th-century Latin writers
Irish Christian monks
Year of birth unknown
Canon law jurists